Ninja Sex Party (often abbreviated as NSP) is an American musical comedy duo consisting of singer Dan Avidan and keyboardist Brian Wecht. They formed in 2009 in New York City and are currently based in Los Angeles. They are also known as two thirds of the more rap-based musical trio Starbomb, together with frequent collaborator Arin Hanson.

The work of Ninja Sex Party typically consists of rock or synth-pop-oriented humorous songs, frequently on the topics of sex, seduction, love or fantasy, with Avidan and Wecht respectively portraying the characters of Danny Sexbang; an idiotic, exuberant, hypersexual Jewish man constantly trying to unsuccessfully hit on women, and Ninja Brian; an uncommunicative, homicidal ninja with erectile dysfunction. However, their Under the Covers cover album series that began in 2016 saw them take on a non-comedic approach to music for the first time, covering various songs from the 1970s, 1980s and 1990s.

To date, NSP has released nine studio albums (six consisting of original material, and three cover albums), in addition to three albums as a part of Starbomb. Wecht initially acted as record producer and performed all instrumentation on their early albums, until they started working with producer Jim Arsenault (and later Jim Roach) and backing band TWRP in 2015. Wecht and Avidan have appeared in Tupper Ware Remix Party's own works, either as individuals or as Ninja Sex Party. Since May 2018, Wecht also portrays Ninja Brian on his own live comedy show titled Ninja Brian's All-Star Variety Luau Spectacular. Every non-cover album that the group has released has reached #1 on the Comedy Albums chart, and their highest peaking album on the Billboard 200 chart was #17 despite being independent.

Career

Formation and early career (2009–2012)

Avidan, who previously sang in bands such as The Northern Hues and Skyhill, initially conceptualized the band. In need of a band member, Avidan was introduced to Wecht, who was the musical director of a comedy troupe in New York, by a mutual friend at the Upright Citizens Brigade Theatre, Julie Katz, a member of Wecht's comedy troupe (who would later be featured in their music video "The Decision"), to whom Avidan had asked if she knew any musicians. The band was formed in February/March 2009 with Avidan going by his stage-name/character "Danny Sexbang" and Wecht going by "Ninja Brian". However, the character "Danny Sexbang" was originally named "Danny Sweetnuts" before being changed to "Sexbang" as Avidan felt the name seemed "stronger."

Inspired by The Lonely Island and Flight of the Conchords, Ninja Sex Party was about "a Jewish superhero who wears a unitard, with his best friend who's a ninja, and together they sing songs about dicks, and try to hit [unsuccessfully] on women."

They began performing together that summer, appearing in various film festivals, including SXSW, Dragon Con, and the LACS. They have been awarded "Best Comedy Video" by Industry Power Play, as well as the "Trophy of Awesomeness" on Vimeo's video website. They won "Best Comedy Video Short" and "Best Comedy Song" in Improvisation News' 2010 INNY Awards. Their video "Sex Training" also appeared on the Comedy page of The Huffington Post. All their early music videos were directed, shot, and edited by Jim Turner, who was the only person paid for his involvement; all other people participating were friends working for free.

In 2011, they released their first album NSFW, on iTunes, which contained both original songs, and all of their previously released songs on YouTube.

Commercial success and side projects (2013–2015)
The band released their second album, Strawberries and Cream, in April 2013. On the week of May 4, 2013, the album debuted at #9 on Billboards Comedy Albums charts.

In July the band released the single "Party of Three", off their third album. The song featured an appearance by animator and Internet personality Arin Hanson.

In September 2013, the band composed "Dick Figures: The Movie: The Song" for Mondo Media's Dick Figures: The Movie soundtrack.

In late 2013, Avidan, Wecht, and Hanson teamed up to create a side project band named Starbomb, with Avidan as the lead singer-songwriter. The band writes parody songs about video games, bringing together the sexually provocative music stylings of Ninja Sex Party and the video game-based humor of Hanson.

On the week of February 15, 2014, Starbomb, the group's eponymous album, would hold the #1 spot in Comedy Albums for 4 consecutive weeks. Starbomb also reached #1 on the Billboard Top Heatseekers charts for 2 consecutive weeks, starting with the week of January 4, 2014. In July 2014, Ninja Sex Party performed a concert for San Diego Comic-Con International at Petco Park. They also released the music video for "Why I Cry" during the concert.

In 2015, two singles were released by the band Tupper Ware Remix Party, collaborating with Ninja Sex Party, titled "The Hit" and "Baby, NYC"; from that point on, TWRP became NSP's backing band on both live shows and studio releases, while also serving as their opening act on live shows.

Their third album, Attitude City, released on July 17, 2015. It was one of the top 20 best-selling albums on Amazon.com, and peaked at #1 on Billboard's US Comedy Albums chart.

On August 3, 2015, Ninja Sex Party performed with Steel Panther at their House of Blues venue, singing "Party All Day." The bands have collaborated on multiple occasions, with Steel Panther making a cameo in the band's "Road Trip" music video, singer Michael Starr providing vocals for "6969", and Satchel performing guitars on "Limelight".

On October 7, 2015, Avidan released the single "Firefly" with Peter Lennox. The two had previously worked together as the atmospheric band Skyhill from 2006 to 2007. The album was acclaimed for the band's "maturing in both lyrics and sound" over their previous album.

Under the Covers albums and Cool Patrol (2016–2019)
On February 23, 2016, a music video was released for their cover of "Take On Me"; the video for their cover of "Everybody Wants to Rule the World" was released one week later, on March 1, 2016. On March 4, 2016, Under the Covers was released to the public. The album features guests appearances by Tupper Ware Remix Party and Super Guitar Bros. The album debuted on the Billboard charts at #9 in Top Album Sales, #2 in Independent Albums, #3 in Rock Albums, and #17 in the Top 200 Albums.

On October 18, 2016, a music video was released for the title song of their next comedy album, Cool Patrol, which features YouTube personalities Jacksepticeye and Markiplier. On February 16, 2017, the music video for the second single off Cool Patrol, "Eating Food in the Shower," was released.

On June 28, 2017, the band announced on their Facebook page that they have completed all the songs for their second cover album, Under the Covers, Vol. II, and its release date of October 27, 2017. The following day, they released the official track listing for the album. On October 11, 2017, they announced that fans can pre-order a deluxe signed version or a deluxe unsigned version, both including posters. The next day, they released a music video for their cover of "Pour Some Sugar on Me".

On October 2, 2017, the band announced that their Rock Hard 2017 Tour was complete, and thanked everyone who participated in the tour.

In November 2017, Avidan mentioned in an episode of Game Grumps that NSP had finished most of the recording of Cool Patrol and that the band is aiming for a June 2018 release for the album. On March 6, 2018, the band released their new original song "Orgy for One" alongside its music video on March 6, 2018. Later that day, they confirmed that most of Cool Patrols post-production was completed, with the band aiming at a "probable July release" which would be preceded with two new original song releases in the meantime. On May 8, 2018, they announced that they were currently recording Under the Covers, Vol. III, and were aiming for a mid-2019 release.

In May 2018, Wecht debuted Ninja Brian's All-Star Variety Luau Spectacular, his own recurring live musical comedy show in which he portrays his Ninja Brian character, minus Avidan. The band also started a new tour, titled Tour de Force, concurrently with the release of the new album, from June 11 to October 19, 2018.

On June 25, 2018, the band released the music video for the song "Danny Don't You Know", along with the official release date of Cool Patrol, August 17. The video featured actor Finn Wolfhard, a friend of Avidan since he had appeared on Game Grumps in January 2017 and a fan of the band, as a younger Danny Sexbang. The band called "Danny Don't You Know" their "favorite-ever song", both musically and as a video. It became the #1 trending video on YouTube. Cool Patrol was released on August 17, 2018, and immediately reached #1 on the Billboard Top Comedy Albums chart, and remains there as of September 28, 2018.

In August 2018, Avidan and Wecht hosted an AMA on Reddit where Avidan confirmed that "(Don't Fear) The Reaper" by Blue Öyster Cult, "Sledgehammer" by Peter Gabriel, "Glory of Love" by Peter Cetera, and "Down Under" by Men at Work would appear on Under the Covers, Vol. III. The duo then went on to tell RIFF Magazine that the album would also include covers of songs by Rush, Def Leppard, the Bee Gees, and Michael Jackson. As of November 2018, ten tracks have been confirmed for the album.

On September 17, 2018, Ninja Sex Party, along with Tupper Ware Remix Party, performed a censored version of "Danny Don't You Know" on the late-night talk show Conan as a musical guest, making their live television debut. This censored version, which replaced the word "fuck" with "heck" and "hell," was released on Spotify on September 21 under the title "Danny Don't You Know (Cool as Heck Version)".

In December 2018, the band was selected by Billboard as the #1 Comedy Album Artist of the year, with Cool Patrol being selected as the #1 comedy album of the year.

On January 5, 2019, Avidan announced an upcoming Ninja Sex Party song on his Instagram titled "Mystic Crystal", which he described as a "13-minute song about wizards." On the March 26 episode of Game Grumps, Avidan revealed that the band was about to re-shoot a music video for their cover of "Wanna Be Startin' Somethin'" by Michael Jackson for Under the Covers, Vol. III in the wake of the documentary Leaving Neverland, stating that "we can't align ourselves with that kind of stuff."

On August 1, 2019, German YouTube personality and musician Flula Borg released the song "Self-Care Sunday", featuring Ninja Sex Party. On November 1, 2019, the band released a music video for their cover of "We Built This City" by Starship to promote pre-orders for Under the Covers, Vol. III. The music video for their cover of "Down Under" by Men At Work was released on November 8, 2019. The album was released on November 15.

The Prophecy and Level Up (2019–2021)
On November 25, 2019, the band premiered a new original song, "The Mystic Crystal", their longest song yet at almost 12 minutes. They also announced that, despite having financed all their previous music videos themselves, the video they envisioned for "The Mystic Crystal" was too expensive to do so, and therefore started selling $20 pins for fans who wished to support the making of the video. The pins were sold out on December 8, making the financing campaign successful. The video was subsequently released on June 9, 2021.

On December 14, 2019, the band released "The Decision Part 2: Ten Years Later", a music video celebrating the band's 10 year anniversary and acting as a sequel to "The Decision", Ninja Sex Party's second-ever song originally released on December 14, 2009; the video also revealed the title of their next original album, The Prophecy.

On April 1, 2020, they released the music video for "I Don't Know What We're Talking About".

On September 28, The Prophecy was officially announced for an October 16 release, with the videos for lead singles "Thunder & Lightning", "Wondering Tonight" and "It's Bedtime" each being released respectively on October 2, 9 and 16. The album debuted at #1 on Billboard's Comedy Albums chart.

On September 23, 2021, the band announced a re-recorded album, Level Up, which was confirmed to have new versions of various previously released songs, in collaboration with TWRP. Level Up was released on October 22, 2021, and debuted at #1 on the Billboard Comedy Albums chart, much like their previous albums.

Up Close and Personal Tour and These Nuts (2022-present)
In 2022, the band went on an acoustic tour with producer Jim Roach and Super Guitar Bros, in which they debuted two new songs; "Death Metal" and "Let's Save the Earth."

In 2023, the band teased an upcoming sixth original album on their social media accounts. On February 17th, they released their first comedy single in 3 years, called "I Own a Car". They also revealed the album's name of These Nuts.

Public image
Wecht manages all Ninja Sex Party social media accounts, as well as Starbomb's and formerly Game Grumps.

The mobile game Shooting Stars features a boss named Grump Dan, who is a reference to Danny Sexbang.

Members 

Band members
 Dan Avidan (Danny Sexbang) – lead and backing vocals (2009–present)
 Brian Wecht (Ninja Brian) – keyboards, programming, spoken and backing vocals (2009–present)

Session and touring musicians
 Arin Hanson – spoken and backing vocals  (2011–present; also performs Starbomb songs at NSP live shows)
 TWRP – backup band, opening act (2015–present)
 Lord Phobos – guitar
 Commander Meouch – bass guitar, backing vocals
 Doctor Sung – keytar, synthesizer, modified vocals
 Havve Hogan – drums

Discography 

Original albums

NSFW (2011)
Strawberries and Cream (2013)
Attitude City (2015)
Cool Patrol (2018)
The Prophecy (2020)
These Nuts (2023)
 Cover albums

Under the Covers (2016)
Under the Covers, Vol. II (2017)
Under the Covers, Vol. III (2019)

 Re-recordings
Level Up (2021)

 Live albums
The Very, Very, Very, Very Classy Acoustic Album (2021)

References

External links

Ninja Sex Party at Bandcamp

 
American comedy duos
American comedy musical groups
Comedy rock musical groups
YouTube channels
Musical groups established in 2009
YouTube channels launched in 2009
RPM channels
Fictional ninja
Bands with fictional stage personas
Masked musicians
Ninja parody
American musical duos